Mixcraft is a digital audio workstation that has been developed by Acoustica since its first release in 2004. Mixcraft is a multitrack recording application for Windows. This music recording software functions as a digital audio workstation, MIDI sequencer, virtual instrument host, non-linear video arranger, and music loop recording program.

Versions 
Acoustica has developed two versions of Mixcraft: 
 Mixcraft Recording Studio: The default version of the music software and currently download-only. The included features are unlimited audio, MIDI, video, and virtual instrument tracks. The recording studio has a loop library of 7,000 loops, samples, and sound effects.
 Mixcraft Pro Studio: The professional version that offers more variety in virtual instruments as well as audio effects. The product has been promoted for the use of professional musicians, producers, and engineers.

Features 
 MIDI: Support for MIDI data played on one or more MIDI controller keyboards.
 VSTi Support: Allows virtual instruments to be played, sequenced, and recorded via MIDI data. (Includes VST 3).
 Multitrack Recording: Allows for recordings to be created simultaneously from multiple sound card or audio interface inputs simultaneously. With a MIDI keyboard connected, it's possible to record both microphone and keyboard inputs at the same time.
 Performance Clip Sequencing: Similar to Ableton and Bitwig, it also supports pattern clip–based arrangement.
 Tempo Matching: This feature attempts to detect the tempo and key of a prerecorded audio file, and change the tempo to match the project tempo.
 Audio Time Stretching & Pitch Shifting: Mixcraft claims to use an advanced algorithm to provide high quality time stretching and pitch shifting while minimizing CPU usage.
 Multiple Import/Export Formats: Supporting MP3, WAV, WMA, OGG, FLAC, AIFF file formats.
 Video Sequencing: Editing, Adding Images, Adding Font, Automation, and Effects (Supports MP4, AVI and WMV files.).

References

External links 
 Mixcraft web page

Audio recording software
Audio software
Computer music software
Digital audio workstation software
Music looping
Software synthesizers
Soundtrack creation software